The Wellington Region of New Zealand has a foundation of Torlesse Greywacke rocks, that make up the Tararua and Rimutaka Ranges, that go from Wellington in the south to the Manawatu Gorge, where they are renamed as the Ruahine Ranges, and continue further north-northeast, towards East Cape.  To the west of the Tararua Ranges are the Manawatu coastal plains.  To the east of the Ruahine Ranges is the Wairarapa-Masterton Basin, then the Eastern Uplands that border the eastern coast of the North Island from Cape Palliser to Napier.

To the east of the North Island is the Hikurangi Trough, a collision zone between the Pacific Plate and the Australian Plate.  The Pacific Plate is being subducted under the Australian Plate, compressing the Wellington Region, and causing the North Island Fault System, and a series of SSW-NNE trending basins and ranges, including the Tararua and Rimutaka Ranges, and the Wairarapa-Masterton Basin.  Successively newer rocks have been accreted to the east coast.

The Wellington Region is prone to major earthquakes, the biggest in historical times being the magnitude 8.2 Wairarapa earthquake on 23 January 1855.

Basement rocks
All basement rocks beneath the Wellington Region belong to the Torlesse Composite Terrane.  They are largely composed of Greywacke (hardened sandstone and mudstone), but also contain Chert, and Pillow lavas.

In the Wellington Region, the Torlesse Composite Terrane is composed of two subterranes, the Rakaia Terrane (late Triassic to early Jurassic, 230-180 Ma), to the west of the Ruahine Ranges, and the Pahau Terrane (late Jurassic to early Cretaceous, 180-100 Ma), to the east.  Major faults such as the Wellington Fault and Wairarapa Fault lie close to the boundary between the terranes.  At the boundary between these two terranes, is the Esk Head Belt, a 20 km wide melange of rocks, broken and deformed by earthquakes along the fault lines near the boundary.

Further to the east of the Wairarapa-Masterton Basin, are successively younger Cretaceous (140-65 Ma) sandstones and mudstones (sometimes called the Waioeka Terrane), that can be regarded as part of the Torlesse Composite Terrane.  There seems to be some disagreement on where to place the boundary between basement rocks and overlying rocks, and the decision seems to be based on the degree of induration.  In the east, even younger and softer sandstones and mudstones occur.

Limestone
Pliocene (5-2 Ma) limestone occurs to the east of the Wairarapa-Masterton Basin, and around Pahiatua, and the Puketoi Range.
Wellington is made of fault lines which cause many earthquakes every year.

Earthquakes
The Wellington Region is prone to major earthquakes. Significant earthquakes originating in or affecting the region include the magnitude 8.2 earthquake on 23 January 1855, the two 1942 Wairarapa earthquakes of magnitude 6.9 on 24 June 1942 and 6.8 on 1 August 1942, and the 2016 Kaikoura earthquake of magnitude 7.8 on 14 November 2016 (over half of the insurance losses from building damage were in Wellington City).

The largest New Zealand earthquake in historical times was the 1855 magnitude 8.2 Wairarapa earthquake.  Near the Wairarapa fault line, the beach rose about 6 m in this earthquake, and horizontal movement was about 12 m. Wellington's Basin Reserve sports ground sits on land lifted by this earthquake; the area had previously been part of a waterway that led into the harbour.

Major faults that may result in significant earthquakes in the Wellington region include the Alpine Fault, and the Marlborough fault system in the South Island, and the Ohariu Fault, Wellington Fault, Wairarapa Fault, Reikorangi Fault, Otaki Forks Fault, and Wairangi Fault in the North Island.

The Wairarapa Fault has an average horizontal slip rate of 6.7–10 mm/year, and vertical change of 1.7 mm/year.  The Wellington fault and Awatere fault in the Marlborough fault system have similar rates of movement.

Beaches around Wellington and Turakirae Head show multiple raised platforms corresponding to previous earthquakes.

Maps
Geological maps of New Zealand can be obtained from the New Zealand Institute of Geological and Nuclear Science (GNS Science), a New Zealand Government Research Institute.

GNS provides a free Map of New Zealand's Geological Foundations.

The main maps are the 1 : 250 000 QMap series, which will be completed as a series of 21 maps and booklets in 2010.  Low resolution versions of these maps (without the associated booklet) can be downloaded from the GNS site for free. The map for the Wellington Area was published in 2000,  and the map for the Wairarapa Area was published in 2002.

There is also a 1 : 50 000 geological map of the Wellington urban area, together with an associated booklet.

See also
Geology of New Zealand
North Island Fault System

References

Further reading
Graham, Ian J. et al.;A continent on the move : New Zealand geoscience into the 21st century -  The Geological Society of New Zealand in association with GNS Science, 2008. 
Plate Tectonics for Curious Kiwis - Aitken, Jefley; GNS Science, 1996. .
  
Reading the rocks : a guide to geological features of the Wairarapa Coast - Homer, Lloyd; Moore, Phil & Kermode, Les; Landscape Publications and the Institute of Geological and Nuclear Sciences, 1989. .
On shaky ground : a geological guide to the Wellington metropolitan region, Graeme Stevens, Geological Society of New Zealand.

Well
Wellington Region